The Kalmar class (Project 1206, NATO reporting name Lebed) are a class of medium-sized assault hovercraft designed for the Soviet Navy. The few remaining craft are operated by the Russian Navy.

Designed by the design bureau wing of Almaz shipbuilding company early in the 1970s, production started in 1972 and continued until 1985 in plants at Leningrad and Theodosia.

Configuration
The Lebed class is the Russian Navy equivalent to the U.S. Navy LCAC, though the U.S. version entered service seven years later. The Lebed class entered service in 1975, and by the early 1990s 20 had been produced. The ship has a bow ramp with a gun on the starboard side and the bridge to port. The type began to be withdrawn following the fall of the Soviet Union, and by 2004 only three remained. Number 533 is in the Northern Fleet, while 639 and 640 took part in the Caspian Sea exercises of 2002.

Capacity
Each hovercraft can carry up to 40 tons of cargo.

Registry
533
639
640

In popular culture
Lebed-class hovercraft were featured in the 1986 Tom Clancy novel Red Storm Rising. In the novel, four Lebeds were used to carry military personnel and equipment from the disguised barge carrier MV Yulius Fuchik to Iceland in a surprise invasion.

See also
 Aist-class LCAC
 Gus-class LCAC
 Tsaplya-class LCAC
 Zubr-class LCAC

See also
List of ships of the Soviet Navy
List of ships of Russia by project number

References

 Saunders, Stephen (RN) Jane's Fighting Ships 2003-2004, 

 

Amphibious warfare vessels of the Soviet Navy
Amphibious warfare vessels of the Russian Navy
Military hovercraft
Landing craft